The 2012 United States House of Representatives election in North Dakota was held on Tuesday, November 6, 2012 to elect the U.S. representative from the state's at-large congressional district. The election coincided with the elections of other federal and state offices, including a quadrennial presidential election and an election to the U.S. Senate. A primary election was held on June 12, 2012; a candidate must receive at least 300 votes to appear on the general election ballot in November.

Rick Berg, a member of the Republican Party who was first elected to represent the at-large district in 2010, had announced that he would not seek re-election but would instead run for the U.S. Senate seat being vacated by Kent Conrad. Republican Kevin Cramer won the open House seat.

Republican primary
The North Dakota Republican Party endorsed Public Service Commissioner Brian Kalk at their state convention, though general election ballot access is determined by a statewide primary election held on June 12, 2012. In contrast to state political tradition, fellow Public Service Commissioner Kevin Cramer did not seek the party endorsement, instead attempting to defeat Kalk on the June primary ballot.

Candidates

Declared
 Kevin Cramer, Public Service Commissioner
 Brian Kalk, Public Service Commissioner and state party endorsed candidate

Withdrew
 Shane Goettle,  U.S. Senator John Hoeven's state director
 Bette Grande, state representative
 DuWayne Hendrickson, perennial candidate
 Kim Koppelman, state representative

Declined
 Rick Berg, incumbent U.S. Representative
 Al Carlson, state House Majority Leader
 Tony Clark, Public Service Commissioner
 Cory Fong, North Dakota State Tax Commissioner
 Tony Grindberg, state senator
 Robert Harms, Tea Party activist and former treasurer of the North Dakota Republican Party
 Kelly Schmidt, North Dakota State Treasurer

Debate
The North Dakota Republican Party held a candidates' debate on December 14 at the campus of Valley City State University. All five GOP candidates declared at the time—Cramer, Goettle, Grande, Kalk, and Koppelman—participated.

Polling

Results

Democratic primary

Candidates

Declared
 Pam Gulleson, former state representative

Declined
 Ben Vig, former state representative

Results

Libertarian nomination
The Libertarian Party of North Dakota has selected small business owner Eric Olson as their nominee at a state meeting.

General election

Polling

Results

References

External links
 North Dakota State Board of Elections
 United States House of Representatives elections in North Dakota, 2012 at Ballotpedia
 North Dakota U.S. House at OurCampaigns.com
 Campaign contributions for U.S. Congressional races in North Dakota from OpenSecrets
 Outside spending at the Sunlight Foundation

Official campaign websites
 Kevin Cramer campaign website
 Pam Gulleson campaign website
 Eric Olson campaign website

2012
United States House of Representatives
North Dakota